Nottingham Hellfire Harlots Roller Derby is a flat track roller derby league based in Nottingham, England. Founded in April 2010, the league has two travel teams who play against teams from other leagues. It is a member of the United Kingdom Roller Derby Association (UKRDA) and the Women's Flat Track Derby Association (WFTDA).

History
The league was founded in May 2010 by seven former members of the Nottingham Roller Girls. The main focus was to create a driven and, most importantly, competitive amateur sporting team. They initially trained at Sport Nottingham, but lost access to the venue and, after a long search, moved to the Djanogly City Academy before finally setting up their permanent home at Southglade Leisure Centre.

In December 2011, the Hellfire Harlots won the Broxtowe Sports Club of the Year award. Later that year, the league joined the UK Roller Derby Association. In October 2012, the Harlots were accepted as a member of the WFTDA Apprentice Program, and became a full member in December 2013.

In May 2014, the Hellfire Harlots took part in the Nottingham Playhouse's tribute to Torvill and Dean, Mass Bolero, and can be seen towards the end of the piece.

In February  2015, the Hellfire Harlots won their first British Champs game against Hot Wheel Roller Derby in their first Tier 2 British Roller Derby Championships.

The Hellfire Harlots also took part in their first WFTDA tournament, "A Skate Odyssey", hosted by GO-GO Gent Roller Derby, in Ghent 15–17 May 2015.

In April 2016, the Hellfire Harlots took part in West Track Story IV, hosted by Nantes Roller Derby, in Nantes.

In January 2017,  the Hellfire Harlots took part in WFTDA tournament Slip It',  hosted by Roller Derby Caen, in France 28-29 January. The same year the league hosted their first European Track Attack 2017 tournament at Lee Westwood sports centre located at Nottingham Trent University. Teams featured were Brussels Derby Pixies, Dundee Roller Girls and Leeds Roller Derby. In November 2017, the Hellfire Harlots took part in Brabo Cup, hosted by Antwerp Roller Derby, in Belgium. 

In April 2018 saw the Hellfire Harlots return to ''West Track Story VI tournament'', hosted by Nantes Roller Derby. Hellfire Harlots took the win after winning every single one of their games. In October 2018, the league hosted for the second time their European tournament Track Attack 2018'' at Lee Westwood sports centre. Teams featured were Antwerp Roller Derby, Amsterdam Roller Derby and Crime City B Team. 

In September 2018, the Hellfire Harlots hosted 'Harlot Fest', a night of celebrating local music in Nottingham. 

Currently, league consists of skaters, non-skating officials and referees. As with most roller derby leagues, they are non-profit and funded by both league membership and fundraising activities. The league has a committee made up of current league members, and all positions are voluntary. The main ethos is "by the skaters, for the skaters". The team motto encompasses this: "Together. All of us."

National Team Representation 
The league's el VISIOUS skated for Team England at the 2011 Roller Derby World Cup.

At the 2018 Roller Derby World Cup, Katie Tokarski was part of the Team Ireland Roller Derby training squad.

WFTDA rankings

*Please note that rankings were suspended in March 2020 in light of the COVID-19 pandemic.

References

Roller derby in England
Sport in Nottingham
Roller derby leagues in the United Kingdom
Roller derby leagues established in 2010
Women's sports teams in England
2010 establishments in England